"Speaking with Trees" is a song by American musician Tori Amos, released as the first single from her sixteenth studio album Ocean to Ocean on September 29, 2021.

Background

The main inspiration behind the song was Amos’ mother. Asked about the meaning of the song she stated:

Additionally, a press release described the song as being about "the absence of live music during the coronavirus pandemic."

The track features many of Amos’ frequent collaborators, including bassist Jon Evans and drummer Matt Chamberlain, alongside husband Mark Hawley on guitar and her daughter Natashya Hawley contributing backing vocals.

Reception

"Speaking with Trees", alongside its parent album, received positive reviews from critics. Medium likened the track to Amos’ earlier material, saying it 
“[partners] painful and sensitive lyrical content with vibrant, offbeat pop hooks.”

Personnel

Tori Amos – vocals, piano, keyboards
John Philip Shenale – synthesizer
Tash – backup vocals
Jon Evans – bass
Matt Chamberlain – drums, percussion
Mark Hawley – guitar, dobro

References

Tori Amos songs
2021 singles
2021 songs